Polecat Hollow is a valley in Carter County in the U.S. state of Missouri.

Polecat Hollow was named for the polecats native to the area.

References

Valleys of Carter County, Missouri
Valleys of Missouri